"Lost in France" is a song recorded by Welsh singer Bonnie Tyler. It was released as a single in September 1976 by RCA Records, written by her producers and songwriters Ronnie Scott and Steve Wolfe. "Lost in France" was Tyler's second single and first chart hit in her career, which featured on her debut album The World Starts Tonight (1977). The lyrics depict Tyler in a daze due to love.

The song was praised by critics, though some preferred her follow-up single "More Than a Lover" for its controversial nature. "Lost in France" was a commercial success. It peaked highest at number two in South Africa, and was also a Top 20 hit in a further six countries.

Background 
Bonnie Tyler was spotted by talent scout Roger Bell in The Townsman Club, Swansea, singing the Ike & Tina Turner song "Nutbush City Limits" with her band Imagination in 1975. She was invited to London to record some demo tracks. After months had passed, Tyler received a phone call from RCA Records, offering her a recording contract. "My! My! Honeycomb" was to become her first single, released in April 1976. The song failed to chart, only receiving local airplay in Wales. In response to this, RCA increased their promotional efforts for the release of "Lost in France", arranging for Tyler to fly to a château in France to meet with a large number of journalists.

Soon after the song's release, Tyler underwent an operation to remove nodules from her vocal cords. She failed to follow the six-week rest period instructed by her doctor and was left with a permanent, distinct raspy quality.

Recording 
Tyler recorded four demos in London in 1975. "My! My! Honeycomb" was released as her first single with "Got So Used to Loving You" as its B-side, and "Lost in France" was released with "Baby I Remember You" as its B-side. David Mackay, Ronnie Scott and Steve Wolfe produced the songs. "Got So Used to Loving You" and "Lost in France" were later chosen to appear on her debut album The World Starts Tonight, which was released in February 1977.

Composition
"Lost in France" is a country pop song with a length of three minutes and 54 seconds. It is set in common time and has a moderate tempo of 118 beats per minute. It is written in the key of B-flat major and Tyler's vocals span one octave and a semitone, from A3 to B-flat4.

Music Video
Tyler is seen singing as she walks through the gardens of a château, inside a cafe, and later singing from an upstairs window.

Chart performance
On the week ending 30 October 1976, "Lost in France" entered the UK Singles Chart weeks after its initial release. Two weeks later, the song reached the Top 40, reaching number twenty-two. "Lost in France" continued to rise until it reached number nine on 27 November, maintaining the position for two weeks. The single gradually dropped following its peak, spending a total of ten weeks on the UK Singles Chart.

Critical reception
The Sydney Morning Herald described the song as the "stand-out track" from The World Starts Tonight, naming it the "most commercial." Record Mirror favoured the follow-up single "More Than a Lover", though agreed "Lost in France" was the more commercial of the two.

Live performances
Tyler's first television promotion for "Lost in France" took place on Top of the Pops on 4 November 1976.

Tyler performed "Lost in France" live in Zaragosa, Spain, in 2005. The performance was recorded and released on Tyler's album Bonnie Tyler Live (2006) and the accompanying DVD Bonnie on Tour (2006).

Track listing
 7" single
 "Lost in France" — 4:03
 "Baby I Remember You" — 3:19

Charts

Weekly charts

Year–end charts

Cover versions
Swedish dansband Wizex covered the song in 1977, featuring Kikki Danielsson on lead vocals. The song was later rereleased on Danielsson's 2001 compilation album Fri.
Chris Conti recorded a dance version of "Lost in France" as a single, released in 1995.

Personnel 
Credits are adapted from liner notes of The World Starts Tonight.
Technical and production

Dave Harris – assistant engineering
Ashley Howe – engineering
Andrew Hoy – production co-ordination
David Mackay – arranging, engineering, producer
George Nicholson – engineering
Ronnie Scott – producer
Simon Wakefield – assistant engineering
Steve Wolfe – producer

Sounding
Bonnie Tyler – vocal

On instruments
Terry Britten – guitar
Dave Christopher – guitar
Mo Foster – bass guitar
Barry Guard – percussion
Simon Phillips – drums
Alan Tarney – bass guitar, guitar
Steve Wolfe – guitar

References

1976 singles
Bonnie Tyler songs
Songs written by Ronnie Scott (songwriter)
Songs written by Steve Wolfe
Songs about France